Ferriday High School is a public high school in Ferriday, Louisiana, United States. It is one of three high schools ran by the Concordia Parish School Board.

Student life
Clubs and activities offered at Ferriday include:

4-H Club
All Girl's Club
Beta Clyb
Future Business Leaders of America
General Cooperative Education
Glee Club
Library Club
Marching Band
Student Council
Trail Blazers

Athletics
Ferriday High athletics competes in the LHSAA.

The following sports are offered at Ferriday:
 Basketball (Co-ed)
 Cheerleading (Girls)
 Football (Boys)
 Track (Co-ed)

Championships
Football championships
(5) State Championships: 1953, 1954, 1955, 1956, 2019

Ferriday has a long history of success in football. They won four straight state championships from 1953 to 1956 and had a combined record of 52-1-2 in those four years.

Demographics
As of 2018, 98.2% of the student population at Ferriday High School are African-American, making up the majority of the student body. 1.8% are Caucasian. According to the 2000 U.S. Census, 70.2% of Ferriday's students live at or below the poverty line. More than 75% of students receive free or reduced lunch.

Notable alumni
Bob Barber, former NFL player
Walter Johnson, former NFL player
Mack Moore, former NFL and CFL player

References

External links 
 

Schools in Concordia Parish, Louisiana
Public high schools in Louisiana